The Men's 4 x 7.5 kilometre biathlon relay competition at the 1980 Winter Olympics took place on 22 February, at Lake Placid Olympic Sports Complex Cross Country Biathlon Center. Each national team consisted of four members, with each skiing 7.5 kilometres and shooting twice, once prone and once standing.

At each shooting station, a competitor has eight shots to hit five targets; however, only five bullets are loaded in a magazine at one time - if additional shots are required, the spare bullets must be loaded one at a time. If after the eight shots are taken, there are still targets not yet hit, the competitor must ski a 150-metre penalty loop.

Results 

The East Germans were the two-time defending world champions, while the defending Olympic champions from the Soviet Union had just one bronze medal to show from those two championships. Vladimir Alikin set the tone for the Soviets in the first leg, putting together the single fastest lap of the relay race, and giving his side a twenty second lead over the East Germans. The lead then expanded when Klaus Siebert struggled, needing a penalty loop on each of his two shooting rounds. At the halfway point, the Soviets were more than a minute ahead, and while the Germans cut down the lead over the last two legs, they weren't able to get close. West Germany struggled early, Franz Bernreiter taking two penalty loops on the first leg, but strong legs from Hans Estner and Peter Angerer got them up to third, and with Norway's Odd Lirhus taking two penalties on the third leg, the West Germans were able to take the bronze.

References

Relay